Florence Cushman (1860-1940) was an American astronomer specializing in stellar classification at the Harvard College Observatory who worked on the Henry Draper Catalogue.

Life 

Florence was born in Boston, Massachusetts in 1860 and received her early education at Charlestown High School, where she graduated in 1877. In 1888, she began work at the Harvard College Observatory as an employee of Edward Pickering. Florence was one of the "Harvard Computers" who worked under Pickering and, following his death in 1919, Annie Jump Cannon.  Her classifications of stellar spectra contributed to Henry Draper Catalogue between 1918 and 1934. She stayed as an astronomer at the Observatory until 1937 and died in 1940 at the age of 80.

Career at the Harvard College Observatory 

Florence Cushman worked at the Harvard College Observatory from 1918 to 1937. Over the course of her nearly fifty-year career, she employed the objective prism method to analyze, classify, and catalog the optical spectra of hundreds of thousands of stars. In the 19th century, the photographic revolution enabled more detailed analysis of the night sky than had been possible with solely eye-based observations.  In order to obtain optical spectra for measurement, male astronomers at the Observatory worked at night, exposing glass photographic plates to capture the astronomical images.

During the daytime, female assistants like Florence analyzed the resultant spectra by reducing values, computing magnitudes, and cataloging their findings. She is credited with determining the positions and magnitudes of the stars listed in the 1918 edition of the Henry Draper Catalogue, which featured the spectra of roughly 222,000 stars.  In describing the dedication and efficiency with which the Harvard Computers, including Florence, undertook this effort, Edward Pickering said, "a loss of one minute in the reduction of each estimate would delay the publication of the entire work by the equivalent of the time of one assistant for two years."

See also 
 Harvard College Observatory
 Harvard Computers
 Henry Draper Catalogue

References

External links 
 Harvard College Observatory History in Images

American women astronomers
1860 births
1940 deaths
People from Boston
Harvard Computers